Cyrtanthus is a genus of perennial, herbaceous and bulbous plants in the family Amaryllidaceae, subfamily Amaryllidoideae.

Taxonomy 
Cyrtanthus is the sole genus in the African tribe Cyrtantheae.

Phylogeny 
The placement of  Cyrtantheae within subfamily Amaryllidoideae is shown in the
following cladogram:

Subdivision 
There are over 50 recognized species, all native to central and southern Africa.

References

Bibliography

External links

Images of several species of Cyrtanthus from Pacific Bulb Society

Amaryllidaceae genera
Amaryllidoideae
Flora of Africa